Bhagalpur College of Engineering (BCE Bhagalpur) is a State Government Technical Institution established in 1960 in Bhagalpur, Bihar, India. This institute offers full-time Bachelor of Technology (B.Tech.)  degree programs. It is administered by the Department of Science and Technology, Bihar. The college is affiliated with Aryabhatta Knowledge University.

History 
The college was set up by the Department of Science and Technology, Government of Bihar in the year 1960. Earlier, the affiliation was under Tilkamanjhi Bhagalpur University. After the establishment of Aryabhatta Knowledge University in 2008, affiliation of the college is transferred to this university.

Admission

UG admission

Earlier, undergraduate admissions were done through the BCECE conducted by Bihar Combined Entrance Competitive Examination Board. From 2019 and onwards admissions is taken through UGEAC based on rank list of JEE Main conducted by National Testing Agency.

PG admission
Admission in M.Tech is done on the basis of GATE score through PGEAC.

Academic departments 
BCE Bhagalpur has nine academic departments"
 Department of Civil Engineering
 Department of Computer Science and Engineering
 Department of Electrical Engineering
 Department of Electronics and Communication Engineering
 Department of Mechanical Engineering
 Department of Physics
 Department of Chemistry
 Department of Mathematics
 Department of Humanities

Degree programs
College conducts educational programs leading to the degree of Bachelor of Technology (B.Tech.) in following branches each with capacity of 63 students.

Civil Engineering
Computer Science and Engineering
Electrical Engineering
Electronics and Communication Engineering
Mechanical Engineering.

Student life

Computer center
BCE, Bhagalpur has a well-equipped centralized computer center to cater to the needs of students and faculty in the university. It is housed, in a magnificent state-of-the-art building having specialized laboratories to provide a variety of platforms and computing environment for UG students. BCE,Bhagalpur computer center presently has around 150 computers connected into LAN in two floors providing internet access and programming facilities to all software related laboratories of all the departments of the college, predominantly CE, ME, ECE, EE, CSE Department
All academic buildings, library, administrative blocks, residential buildings, and all the hostels of BCE,Bhagalpur are connected using optical fiber links and around 95 Wi-Fi access points.

Digital library
Digital library also known as digital repository is an online database having digital objects in different formats such as text, audio, video, images, etc.Digital library provides access to multiple users at time and requires very little space. The information retrieval is quite easy.Bhagalpur College of Engineering provides the access for both the students and Faculties. The digital platform offers around 3000 online courses. The students and faculties can interact on the online portal and faculties can upload their self taught lectures on the platform. The digital library is hosted both on the online portal and on the Android app.
Online portal link: bec.skylearning.in

Hostels
BCE, Bhagalpur provides hostel facilities to boys & girls. It has 4 Boys' hostels and 1 Girls' hostel having spacious rooms, periodic maintenance of rooms, hygienic food. Application for admission to the hostel shall be made in the prescribed form. Caring warden, hostel superintendent and proper security ensure safe and pleasant stay for the students to focus on their studies.

Medical facilities
For the protection, preservation and promotion of health, a well-organized program of health instruction is essential for the students. The college provides medical facilities and health education program for the benefit of the students. The college invites a registered medical practitioner from time to time to examine the student's health.

Sports
College has playground for various sports like Volleyball, Cricket. It also has indoor stadium for Badminton.

College fests
Bhagalpur College of Engineering organizes Technoriti as its annual festival every year from 2012. Started with the name AAGHAZ the festival comprises Parakram the annual Sports meet, Umang the Cultural festival and technical fest. Later in 2013, the name aaghaz was changed to Technoriti by the student organization which additionally included Sangam as the Alumni meet of BCE Bhagalpur.

References

External links
 

Engineering colleges in Bihar
Education in Bhagalpur district
Universities and colleges in Bhagalpur
Educational institutions established in 1960
1960 establishments in Bihar
Colleges affiliated to Aryabhatta Knowledge University